The Mercedes-Benz OM604 is a  and  inline-four cylinder (R4/I4) double overhead camshaft (DOHC) diesel engine with indirect injection manufactured by Mercedes-Benz between 1993 and 1998. It replaced the single overhead camshaft (SOHC) OM601 engine.
Unlike other Mercedes Benz diesels at the time that used a Bosch inline injection pump the OM604 used the Lucas electronically controlled rotary distributor injection pump (EVE) which is less reliable.
The seals of the Lucas injection pumps become brittle over time and leak, a seal kit is available

It is related to the straight-5 2.5 litre OM605 and the straight-6 3.0 litre OM606 engines.

Design 

As per the OM601 the engine has a cast iron block and aluminum cylinder head, the block has 5 main caps, they are held by two bolts per cap. The head is a DOHC design with 4 valves x cylinder and split intake ports. As per the OM601 it has hydraulic bucket type lifters, thus requiring no periodical valve adjustment

It has a double row timing chain that drives the injection pump and the camshafts, the sprocket is on the exhaust camshaft and both cams are connected by a gear drive, while the oil pump is driven by a separate single row chain

Specifications

SsangYong D20DT engine / OM664.95x 
The Korean company Ssangyong has developed D20DT (created under license from Mercedes) series diesel engines based on the OM604 engine. Compared to the original Mercedes diesel, the Korean uses the Common Rail fuel injection system, turbocharging (unlike N/A OM604) and has slightly increased the engine capacity to 1,998 cc, compared to 1,997 cc in the OM604. In the Mercedes range, the engine has an index of OM664.950 / 951 and was installed on the Actyon, Actyon Sports and Kyron models in the mid-2000s.

See also 
 List of Mercedes-Benz engines

References

OM604
Diesel engines by model
Straight-four engines